Giorgi Gadrani (30 September 1994) is a Georgian professional football defender who plays for Samtredia.

Club career
He has also played for FC Chornomorets Odessa and for Desna Chernihiv in the Ukrainian Premier League, where he played 7 games. In summer 2018 he moved to Dila Gori

VPK-Ahro Shevchenkivka
In 2021, he moved to VPK-Ahro Shevchenkivka in the Ukrainian First League and on 23 April, he played in the match against Chornomorets Odesa at the Chornomorets Stadium.

Samtredia
In summer 2021, he moved to Samtredia in Erovnuli Liga. On 8 August he made his debut with the new club against Dinamo Batumi at the Batumi Stadium and he started playing more regular. On 1 November 2021 he scored his first goal with the new club against Locomotive Tbilisi in Erovnuli Liga in the season 2021. On 21 November 2021 he scored against Torpedo Kutaisi in Erovnuli Liga in the season 2021.

Sioni Bolnisi
In 2022 he signed to Sioni Bolnisi just promoted to Erovnuli Liga.

Honours
Torpedo Kutaisi
 Georgian Super Cup: 2019

FC Dinamo Batumi
 Erovnuli Liga: Runner Up 2019

Dinamo Tbilisi
 Erovnuli Liga: Runner Up 2017

References

External links

allplayers.in.ua
Profile on Official website of Ukrainian Second League
FC Chernomorets official Profile
Facebook.com

1994 births
Living people
Footballers from Georgia (country)
Georgia (country) under-21 international footballers
FC Gagra players
FC Chornomorets Odesa players
FC Dinamo Tbilisi players
FC Desna Chernihiv players
FC Dila Gori players
FC Dinamo Batumi players
FC Torpedo Kutaisi players
FC Shukura Kobuleti players
FC VPK-Ahro Shevchenkivka players
FC Samtredia players
FC Sioni Bolnisi players
Erovnuli Liga players
Ukrainian Premier League players
Ukrainian First League players
Expatriate footballers from Georgia (country)
Expatriate footballers in Ukraine
Expatriate sportspeople from Georgia (country) in Ukraine
Association football defenders